Donald George Beaumont Roper (14 December 1922 – 8 June 2001) was an English footballer.

Playing career
Born in Botley, Hampshire, Roper was a prolific scorer as a schoolboy. He was spotted playing parks football by Toby Keleher, assistant manager to Tom Parker, and in July 1940 was persuaded to sign for his local club, Southampton, making his debut for them during wartime matches. By the resumption of competitive football in 1946, Roper had established himself as a "two-footed powerful (right) winger".

After impressing in the Second Division in 1946–47 he was signed by Arsenal in the close season for £12,000, plus George Curtis and Tom Rudkin moving in the opposite direction, an estimated total fee of £24,000. Arsenal had been so keen to secure Roper's signature that their manager Tom Whittaker had made eleven visits to The Dell.

Roper immediately became a regular for the Gunners, playing 40 times and scoring ten goals in 1947–48, as Arsenal won the First Division. He switched to the left wing in 1949–50 but was displaced by Denis Compton in Arsenal's FA Cup-winning side of 1950. He regained his place the following season, and continued to be a near ever-present for Arsenal for the next five. He played in Arsenal's 1952 FA Cup Final defeat to Newcastle United, although in that match he was forced to deputise for full back Walley Barnes after Barnes was stretchered off with an injury.

In 1952–53 Roper enjoyed one of his finest seasons – winning another League title and earned an England B cap against Scotland B, although he never played for the full England side. He also scored five in a friendly match against Hibernian in 1952, which was one of the first in the country to be played under floodlights.

Roper enjoyed another two seasons as a first-team regular, but lost his Arsenal first-team place during 1955–56, dropping down to the reserves. He played 321 matches for Arsenal in total, scoring 95 goals.

He rejoined former club Southampton who were now in the Third Division (South), in January 1957. He went on to become club captain, playing alongside star player Derek Reeves and the young Terry Paine. At the end of the 1958–59 season Roper fell out with the club over terms and alleged promises from Ted Bates of a place as trainer and left nursing a grudge which he never overcame, refusing to attend any club reunions or even to visit The Dell.

He finished his career by playing for Weymouth and Dorchester Town, finally retiring from the game in 1963.

He also played first-class cricket for Hampshire once in 1947 against Cambridge University. After retiring from the game, he settled in Southampton and worked as an engineer. He died in 2001, at the age of 78.

Honours
Arsenal
 First Division championship: 1947–48, 1952–53
 FA Cup finalist: 1952
 FA Charity Shield: 1948, 1953

References

External links
Obituary in The Guardian

1922 births
2001 deaths
People from Botley, Hampshire
Association football forwards
English footballers
Southampton F.C. players
Arsenal F.C. players
England B international footballers
English cricketers
Hampshire cricketers
Weymouth F.C. players
Dorchester Town F.C. players
Eastleigh F.C. players
English Football League players
English Football League representative players
Association football wingers
FA Cup Final players